Tunnel Mill can refer to:
 Tunnel Mill (Spring Valley, Minnesota), listed on the NRHP in Minnesota
John Work House and Mill Site, near Charlestown, Indiana